Ann Kelley is an American politician and educator serving as a member of the Missouri House of Representatives from the 127th district. Elected in November 2018, she assumed office in January 2019.

Early life and education 
Kelley was born in Joplin, Missouri and attended Liberal High School in Liberal, Missouri. She earned a Bachelor of Science degree in middle school science and English from Missouri Southern State University and a Master of Science in curriculum and middle school reading and writing from Grand Canyon University.

Career 
Kelley began her career as an English teacher in the Lamar School District. Kelley is a member of the National Rifle Association, Missouri Farm Bureau, and the Missouri State Teachers Association. She was also a board member of the Barton County Ambulance District. She was elected to the Missouri House of Representatives in November 2018 and assumed office in January 2019. She is an avid conspiracy theorist and election denier. 
Kelley gained national exposure when sponsoring a perceived anti-LGBTQ bill, the Parental Rights in Education act on the 23rd February 2023. Kelley was challenged on the state House floor by fellow Republican Representatives Phil Christofanelli over the wording and application, eventually forcing Kelley to acknowledge that she did not know how it would be applied in reference to talking about Martha Washington being the wife of George Washington because of sexual orientation.

Electoral History

State Representative

References 

Living people
Republican Party members of the Missouri House of Representatives
People from Joplin, Missouri
Missouri Southern State University alumni
Grand Canyon University alumni
Women state legislators in Missouri
Year of birth missing (living people)